Thanhha Lai (Vietnamese: Lai T. Thanh Hà; born January 1, 1965) is a Vietnamese-American writer of children's literature. She won the 2011 National Book Award for Young People's Literature
and a Newbery Honor for her debut novel, Inside Out & Back Again, which was published by HarperCollins.

Personal life
Lai was born in Saigon (now Ho Chi Minh City), on January 1, 1965. She has six older brothers. Ten years later, she fled Vietnam during the Fall of Saigon, with her family. She then moved to Alabama and graduated from University of Texas, Austin with a degree in journalism in 1988, and worked for about two years for the Orange County, California newspaper The Register, covering news about Little Saigon, the local Vietnamese community. She earned a Master of Fine Arts from New York University and moved to New York, where she teaches at Parsons The New School for Design. Today, she goes by Thanhhà Lại on her website and lives in Croton-on-Hudson.

Inside Out and Back Again
Virginia Wolff interviewed Lai for the January 2010 number of  School Library Journal. She calls Inside Out "a powerful story in slender, sinewy prose poems, just a few words in each line." Hà and her family flee home and meet America's "sharp-edged barriers of color, ethnicity, religion, and custom."

Lai worked for 30 years on an adult novel. In her own words it was "third-person omniscient, spanning 4000 years of Vietnamese history, and whiplashed by hundreds of overly dramatic, showy sentences." The transformation worked when she got "inside the mind of a 10-year-old girl who feels as much as an adult but can’t express the emotions yet, it seemed right to employ a few precise, pungent words and have them explode into real, raw emotions."

The fictional girl Hà once says, "No one would believe me, but at times I would choose wartime in Saigon over peacetime in Alabama." The story features her discovery of an adjustment to "the foreign world of Alabama". A review by Publishers Weekly calls it "especially poignant as she cycles from feeling smart in Vietnam to struggling in the States, and finally regains academic and social confidence."

Lai explains, "She felt dumb in Vietnam.... For her, being smart equated to confidence that she could manage her world. That’s why she would choose wartime in Saigon over peacetime in Alabama." In America, the little girl writes,
 So this is
 what dumb
feels like.

Works
 Watermark: Vietnamese American poetry & prose. Asian American Writers' Workshop. 1998. — anthology including work by Lai
 — winner of the National Book Award and one of two runners-up for the Newbery Medal

Hundred Years of Happiness. HarperCollins. 2022.

See also

References

External links

 
 Thanhha Lai Official Website

1965 births
Living people
American children's writers
American writers of Vietnamese descent
Vietnamese emigrants to the United States
Moody College of Communication alumni
New York University alumni
The New School faculty
National Book Award for Young People's Literature winners
21st-century American novelists
21st-century American women writers
American women children's writers
American women novelists
Novelists from New York (state)
American women academics